= CRPF =

CRPF may refer to:

- Central Reserve Police Force, India
- Carbon-fiber reinforced polymer
